The 2015 Vuelta a la Comunidad de Madrid was the 28th edition of the Vuelta a la Comunidad de Madrid cycling stage race. It started on 9 May in Colmenar Viejo and ended on 10 May in El Pardo.

Schedule
Two stages were held.

Teams
The start list included 11 teams: 1 UCI WorldTeam, 1 UCI Professional Continental team, and 9 UCI Continental teams.

Stages

Stage 1
9 May 2015 — Colmenar Viejo to Colmenar Viejo,

Stage 2
10 May 2015 — Distrito de Fuencarral to El Pardo (Barrio del Pilar),

Classification leadership table

Final standings

General classification

Points classification

Mountains classification

Sprints classification

Young rider classification

Teams classification

References

External links

Vuelta a la Comunidad de Madrid
Vuelta
Vuelta